The Old Irion County Courthouse, on Public Square in Sherwood, Texas, was built in 1901.  It was listed on the National Register of Historic Places in 1977 as Irion County Courthouse.

It is a two-story, square-plan stone building.

The courthouse was a work of master builders Martin & Moodie.

It served as a courthouse until 1936.

See also

National Register of Historic Places listings in Irion County, Texas
List of county courthouses in Texas

References

Courthouses in Texas
Courthouses on the National Register of Historic Places in Texas
National Register of Historic Places in Irion County, Texas
Government buildings completed in 1901